Jon Joseph Kimmel (born July 21, 1960) is a former American football linebacker in the National Football League for the Philadelphia Eagles and the Washington Redskins.  He played college football at Colgate University.  

1960 births
Living people
American football linebackers
Philadelphia Eagles players
Washington Redskins players